Libu is an ancient Libyan tribe of Berber origin. 

Libu may also refer to:

Imperial Chinese government
Ministry of Personnel, one of the Six Ministries 
Ministry of Rites, another one of the Six Ministries

Places
Libu, Guangdong (黎埠), a town in Yangshan County, Guangdong, China
Libu, Guangxi (梨埠), a town in Cangwu County, Guangxi, China
Libu, Hubei (李埠), a town in Jingzhou, Hubei, China